UEFA Euro 2008 is the official video game of the Euro 2008 football tournament, published by EA Sports. It was developed  collaboratively by EA Canada and HB Studios and was released in Europe and North America on 18 April 2008 and 19 May 2008 respectively. The commentary was provided by Clive Tyldesley and Andy Townsend.

Anthem mistake

EA issued an apology after mistakenly using the Soldier's Song as Northern Ireland's anthem within the game, instead of God Save the Queen. Public Relations head Shaun White said:

The apology was welcomed by Northern Irish Culture, Arts and Leisure Minister Gregory Campbell who said:

Reception

The PlayStation 2, PlayStation 3 and Xbox 360 versions received "generally favorable reviews", while the PSP and PC versions received "average" reviews, according to the review aggregation website Metacritic.

References

External links
 

UEFA EURO
Association football video games
EA Sports games
Electronic Arts games
Esports games
Euro 2008
HB Studios games
Multiplayer and single-player video games
PlayStation 2 games
PlayStation 3 games
PlayStation Portable games
Video game
UEFA European Championship video games
Video games developed in Canada
Video games set in 2008
Video games set in Austria
Video games set in Switzerland
Windows games
Xbox 360 games